Tony Sabrina Bombardieri (born 14 April 1978 in Bergamo) is an Italian former competitive figure skater. She is a two-time Italian national champion (1997–98). Her first major international event was the 1995 European Championships in Dortmund, Germany, where she placed 14th. She competed at the 1998 Winter Olympics in Nagano, Japan, but did not reach the free skate.

Bombardieri began skating in 1984. She is a coach at S.S.D. S.r.l. Icelab in Bergamo. She is married to former ice dancer Luca Mantovani.

Programs

Competitive highlights 
GP: Champions Series (Grand Prix)

References 

1978 births
Figure skaters at the 1998 Winter Olympics
Italian female single skaters
Living people
Olympic figure skaters of Italy
Sportspeople from Bergamo